The Pines Beach is a small town situated roughly 4 km east of Kaiapoi in the Canterbury region of the South Island of New Zealand. It is 1 km north of the mouth of the Waimakariri River.
It takes its name from its close proximity to both a pine forest and the beach.

The Pines Beach is a relatively small town. The majority of the area consists of residential housing and a park called "The Pines Beach Oval". The village store was demolished after the September 2010 Canterbury earthquake, along with a considerable number of the houses in the village, which were placed into a residential red zone by the Canterbury Earthquake Recovery Authority. Empty green spaces upon entering the village from Beach Road is all that remains of these earlier parts of the settlement.

The Oval is a small section of land in the centre of the town. It is in the shape of an oval and has a playground, basketball court, swings, a skate park and a BMX track. An annual gala is held on the Oval.

Demographics
It is part of the wider Pegasus Bay statistical area.

Pines Beach had a population of 327 at the 2018 New Zealand census, a decrease of 27 people (-7.6%) since the 2013 census, and a decrease of 159 people (-32.7%) since the 2006 census. There were 126 households. There were 174 males and 153 females, giving a sex ratio of 1.14 males per female, with 57 people (17.4%) aged under 15 years, 57 (17.4%) aged 15 to 29, 177 (54.1%) aged 30 to 64, and 36 (11.0%) aged 65 or older.

Ethnicities were 85.3% European/Pākehā, 19.3% Māori, 2.8% Pacific peoples, 0.9% Asian, and 1.8% other ethnicities (totals add to more than 100% since people could identify with multiple ethnicities).

Although some people objected to giving their religion, 64.2% had no religion, 23.9% were Christian and 1.8% had other religions.

Of those at least 15 years old, 42 (15.6%) people had a bachelor or higher degree, and 57 (21.1%) people had no formal qualifications. The employment status of those at least 15 was that 141 (52.2%) people were employed full-time, 42 (15.6%) were part-time, and 15 (5.6%) were unemployed.

Pegasus Bay statistical area

Pegasus Bay had a population of 1,047 at the 2018 New Zealand census, a decrease of 12 people (-1.1%) since the 2013 census, and a decrease of 111 people (-9.6%) since the 2006 census. There were 402 households. There were 570 males and 477 females, giving a sex ratio of 1.19 males per female. The median age was 46.7 years (compared with 37.4 years nationally), with 177 people (16.9%) aged under 15 years, 141 (13.5%) aged 15 to 29, 555 (53.0%) aged 30 to 64, and 177 (16.9%) aged 65 or older.

Ethnicities were 90.8% European/Pākehā, 13.2% Māori, 1.4% Pacific peoples, 1.4% Asian, and 1.4% other ethnicities (totals add to more than 100% since people could identify with multiple ethnicities).

The proportion of people born overseas was 12.9%, compared with 27.1% nationally.

Although some people objected to giving their religion, 58.7% had no religion, 28.7% were Christian, 0.3% were Muslim, 0.3% were Buddhist and 3.7% had other religions.

Of those at least 15 years old, 102 (11.7%) people had a bachelor or higher degree, and 240 (27.6%) people had no formal qualifications. The median income was $30,400, compared with $31,800 nationally. The employment status of those at least 15 was that 402 (46.2%) people were employed full-time, 144 (16.6%) were part-time, and 48 (5.5%) were unemployed.

References

Waimakariri District
Populated places in Canterbury, New Zealand